Cincinnati Landmark Productions is a theatre company in Cincinnati, OH. It is the parent organization for the Showboat Majestic, the Covedale Center for the Performing Arts, the Warsaw Federal Incline Theatre, and Cincinnati Young People's Theatre.

External links
 http://cincinnatilandmarkproductions.com

Theatre companies in Cincinnatia
Arts in Cincinnati